The canton of Chauffailles is an administrative division of the Saône-et-Loire department, eastern France. Its borders were modified at the French canton reorganisation which came into effect in March 2015. Its seat is in Chauffailles.

It consists of the following communes:
 
Amanzé
Anglure-sous-Dun
Baudemont
Bois-Sainte-Marie
Briant
La Chapelle-sous-Dun
Chassigny-sous-Dun
Châteauneuf
Châtenay
Chauffailles
La Clayette
Coublanc
Curbigny
Fleury-la-Montagne
Gibles
Iguerande
Ligny-en-Brionnais
Mailly
Mussy-sous-Dun
Oyé
Saint-Bonnet-de-Cray
Saint-Christophe-en-Brionnais
Saint-Didier-en-Brionnais
Saint-Edmond
Sainte-Foy
Saint-Igny-de-Roche
Saint-Julien-de-Jonzy
Saint-Laurent-en-Brionnais
Saint-Martin-de-Lixy
Saint-Maurice-lès-Châteauneuf
Saint-Racho
Saint-Symphorien-des-Bois
Sarry
Semur-en-Brionnais
Tancon
Vareilles
Varenne-l'Arconce
Varennes-sous-Dun
Vauban

References

Cantons of Saône-et-Loire